Tara Hill (Torrchoill in Irish) is an isolated hill and associated village near the Irish Sea coast in north County Wexford, Ireland. It provides extensive views of the Wexford coast line, from Courtown harbour to Castletown.

Location 
Tara Hill is situated at a particularly high point along the south east coast of Ireland and is surrounded by flat residential and agricultural land. There is a small village located at the heart of the hill. Tara Hill is located approximately 7.1 km from Gorey Town Centre and 107.5 km from Dublin.

Contemporary village 
Tara Hill has many facilities including a church, a primary school (St Kevins), the local shop selling general groceries shut her doors in 2018 and a drumming school is using the building now. Businesses in the area include Tara Hill Estate, Sound Out Rhythm Music School, Tara Hill Honey and Ballinglen Stud.

The closest villages to Tara Hill are Castletown, Ballymoney and Courtown. Nearby Gorey serves as a market town for the area, with a range of grocery stores, fashion boutiques, and restaurants including, Katie Daly's, The Kitchen,. 

Tara Hill has two main walking trails around the Marilyn starting close to the village centre [see Tourism].

The village is closely linked to Dublin by the M11/N11 National Primary Route, and the national rail network from gorey connects it to Rosslare Europort.

Geography 
Due to its height relative to the surrounding landscape this hill qualifies as a Marilyn. It should not be confused with the much better known but much less prominent Royal Hill of Tara in County Meath, which is only 159m high.

The summit is marked by a cairn from where one can see nearby Gorey, Courtown and other villages and town-lands and views of the North Wexford coast.

Though only 253 metres high, it dominates the landscape of northeast Wexford and can be seen from Gorey Town Centre.

History 
Saint Caemhan or Kevin or Cavan, as the name is variously spelt is the Patron Saint of Tara Hill and the site of the old church founded by him is situated at Kilcavan at the north side of the hill under a cliff by the road.

The community in Tara Hill and Ballymoney announced in 2009 that they were making efforts to preserve the past, with plans to produce a new book on the social history of the area. A 'Minding Memories' night was held in Tara Hill to offer locals a chance to record their memories of the area back as far as the war years, and even earlier. It is said that several locals recalled Spencer's Hall on the bank of the North Beach, where dances were held in the 1940s and 1950s. Its foundations can still be seen. Others recalled Clince's Hall at the bottom of the Sea Road, where there was also a guest house. The hall is now a private dwelling. It too was used for dances and also for a table tennis club. Other people recalled the farming enterprises which were used to make money but also provided for the families themselves. Accounts have been given how Tara Hill Church also doubled as a school until the 'new school' was built in 1939. Other people recalled going to Gorey for the cattle fair day on a Friday, and how there were four different grocery stores in the town, each one patronised by people from different villages. The people of Tara Hill used to shop in Dwyers close to where the Loch Garman Arms is now. Several accounts of sightings of apparitions and strange lights in the woods of Tara Hill have also been recorded in local history adding to legend that it is reportedly haunted.

Tourism 
B&B's in the area include Tara Hill Lodge, Hillside House Bed & Breakfast, Daru House B&B, and Tara Haven. Seafield Hotel & Spa Resort in nearby Ballymoney, serves as a hotel for tourists staying in the local area. The area also has a number of beaches, including Clone Strand and nearby Ballymoney Beach. There are two trails on Tara Hill, starting from two different trailheads (Crab Tree – Blue and Cemetery – Red). The Red Slí an tSuaimhnais trail begins from Tara Hill cemetery just beyond the village itself. The Blue Slí na n-Óg trail, beginning from the Ballinacarrig parking place (known locally as the Crab Tree) goes to the higher slopes of Tara Hill itself.

Schools 
St. Kevin's National School is located in Tara Hill Village. The school caters for junior infants to 6th class pupils. The school regularly organises outings to nearby Tara Hill and Glendalough, and has a vegetable garden on its premises.Tara hill is not a village

Sports 
The local GAA club (Castletown Liam Mellows) is located just meters down the road on the Castletown, Tara Hill border.

Religion 
St. Kevins Catholic church is located at Kilcavan Lower in Tara Hill.

See also
 Gorey
 Wexford
 List of towns and villages in Ireland

References 

Mountains and hills of County Wexford
Marilyns of Ireland